is a Japanese drama series premiered in October 2021. Based on the novel Japan Sinks by Sakyo Komatsu, the series aired on TBS and its affiliates, and also aired internationally on Netflix as a part of a three-series deal between Netflix and TBS.

Cast 
 Shun Oguri as Keishi Amami
 Kenichi Matsuyama as Koichi Tokiwa
 Anne Watanabe as Minori Shiina
 Toru Nakamura as Prime Minister Eiichi Higashiyama
 Teruyuki Kagawa as Yusuke Tadokoro
 Eiji Wentz as Taira Ishizuka
 Anne Nakamura as Misuzu Aihara
 Yūki Yoda (Nogizaka46) as Ai Yamada
 Jun Kunimura as Tōru Sera
 Takashi Kobayashi as Isao Fujioka
 Jun Fubuki as Yoshie Amami
 Manami Higa as Kaori Amami
 Yoshiko Miyazaki as Kazuko Shiina
 Kōtarō Yoshida (special appearance) as Mamoru Amami
 Tetta Sugimoto as Shūya Naganuma
 Morio Kazama as Makoto Ikushima
 Renji Ishibashi as Gen Satoshiro

References

External links 
 

Japanese science fiction television series
Mystery television series
2020s Japanese television series debuts
Television series based on novels
2021 Japanese television series debuts
Works about politicians
Works about earthquakes
Television series about journalism
Television shows set in Tokyo
Television shows set in Kanagawa Prefecture
Television shows set in Ehime Prefecture
Television shows set in Shizuoka Prefecture
Television shows set in Hokkaido
Television shows set in California
2020s college television series